Miss South Africa 2009 was held on 13 December 2009 in Sun City, South Africa. The winner will represent South Africa at Miss Universe 2010 and Miss World 2010. 12 contestants competed for the crown. Nicole Flint was crowned Miss South Africa 2009 by the outgoing title holder Tatum Keshwar from Durban.

Results

Placements
Color keys

Contestants

Crossovers
The following contestants previously competed at notable national and international beauty pageants:

1st Runner up Matapa Maila competed in Miss Earth 2008 but she did not place

References

External links
Miss SA Official Website
 Miss South Africa Contestants

2009
South Africa
2009 in South Africa
December 2009 events in South Africa